John Patrick Molloy (March 13, 1873 – March 16, 1948) was a Canadian veterinarian and politician.

Born in Arthur, Ontario of Irish Canadian parentage, Molloy was educated in the public and secondary schools of Ontario. He later attended the Ontario Veterinary College where he graduated in 1902. He spent the following year doing post graduate studies at the McKillip Veterinary College in Chicago where he received a M.D.V. degree. He returned to Canada settling in Morris, Manitoba where he established a practice.

He ran as a candidate for the Legislative Assembly of Manitoba in the 1907 election but was defeated. He was elected to the House of Commons of Canada for the electoral district of Provencher in the 1908 federal election. A Liberal, he was re-elected in 1911 and 1917. He was defeated in 1921 and was summoned to the Senate of Canada on the advice of William Lyon Mackenzie King in 1925 representing the senatorial division of Provencher, Manitoba. He served until his death in 1948.

Electoral history

References
 
 

1873 births
1948 deaths
Canadian senators from Manitoba
Liberal Party of Canada MPs
Liberal Party of Canada senators
Members of the House of Commons of Canada from Manitoba
People from Wellington County, Ontario
Canadian veterinarians
Male veterinarians
People from Morris, Manitoba